Noble Corporation plc is an offshore drilling contractor organized in London, United Kingdom. Its affiliate, Noble Corporation, is organized in the Cayman Islands. It is the corporate successor of Noble Drilling Corporation.

The company operates 24 drilling rigs including 8 drillships, 4 semi-submersible platforms, and 12 jackup rigs.

In 2020, 26.6% of revenues were from Exxon Mobil, 21.7% of revenues were from Royal Dutch Shell, 14.3% of revenues were from Equinor, and 13.8% of revenues were from Saudi Aramco.

History
In 1985, Noble Affiliates, Inc., completed the corporate spin-off of Noble Drilling Corporation.

In 2002, the company underwent a restructuring whereby it moved its domicile to the Cayman Islands and established Noble Corporation as the parent holding company.

In early 2009, the company moved its domicile from the Cayman Islands to Switzerland due to the potential for more U.S. taxes on Caribbean tax havens. In 2013, the company moved to the United Kingdom.

In 2010, the company acquired Frontier Drilling in a $2.16 billion cash transaction.

In 2014, the company distributed its interests in Paragon Offshore plc to its shareholders.

In July 2020, the company filed for bankruptcy; it emerged from bankruptcy in February 2021.

In April 2021, the company acquired Pacific Drilling.

In November 2021, it was announced that Maersk Drilling will merge with Noble Corporation and the combined company will be called Noble Corporation with a valuation of £2.6 billion.

Accidents and incidents
In 2012, the Noble Discoverer drillship, operating under contract for Royal Dutch Shell lost its mooring and drifted close to shore. There were no injuries or environmental damage reported as a result of the accident.

In 2017, an employee went missing on the Noble Lloyd Noble drilling rig.

References

1985 establishments in the United Kingdom
Companies formerly listed on the New York Stock Exchange
Companies that filed for Chapter 11 bankruptcy in 2020
Drilling rig operators
Energy engineering and contractor companies
Non-renewable resource companies established in 1985
Service companies of the United States
Tax inversions